The Séminaire Nicolas Bourbaki (Bourbaki Seminar) is a series of seminars (in fact public lectures with printed notes distributed) that has been held in Paris since 1948.  It is one of the major institutions of contemporary mathematics, and a barometer of mathematical achievement, fashion, and reputation. It is named after Nicolas Bourbaki, a group of French and other mathematicians of variable membership.

The Poincaré Seminars are a series of talks on physics inspired by the Bourbaki seminars on mathematics.

1948/49 series 

 Henri Cartan, Les travaux de Koszul, I  (Lie algebra cohomology)
 Claude Chabauty, Le théorème de Minkowski-Hlawka (Minkowski-Hlawka theorem)
 Claude Chevalley,  L'hypothèse de Riemann pour les corps de fonctions algébriques de caractéristique p, I, d'après Weil (local zeta-function)
 Roger Godement, Groupe complexe unimodulaire, I : Les représentations unitaires irréductibles du groupe complexe unimodulaire, d'après Gelfand et Neumark (representation theory of the complex special linear group)
 Léo Kaloujnine, Sur la structure de p-groupes de Sylow des groupes symétriques finis et de quelques généralisations infinies de ces groupes (Sylow theorems, symmetric groups, infinite group theory)
 Pierre Samuel,  (birational geometry)
 Jean Braconnier, Sur les suites de composition d'un groupe et la tour des groupes d'automorphismes d'un groupe fini, d'après H. Wielandt (finite groups)
 Henri Cartan, Les travaux de Koszul, II (see 1)
 Claude Chevalley, L'hypothèse de Riemann pour les groupes de fonctions algébriques de caractéristique p, II, d'après Weil (see 3)
 Luc Gauthier,  (see 6)
 Laurent Schwartz, Sur un mémoire de Petrowsky : "Über das Cauchysche Problem für ein System linearer partieller Differentialgleichungen im gebiete nichtanalytischen Funktionen" (partial differential equations)
 Henri Cartan, Les travaux de Koszul, III  (see 1)
 Roger Godement, Groupe complexe unimodulaire, II : La transformation de Fourier dans le groupe complexe unimodulaire à deux variables, d'après Gelfand et Neumark (see 4)
 Marc Krasner, Les travaux récents de R. Brauer en théorie des groupes (finite groups)
 Laurent Schwartz, Sur un deuxième mémoire de Petrowsky : "Über das Cauchysche Problem für System von partiellen Differentialgleichungen"  (see 11)
 André Weil, Théorèmes fondamentaux de la théorie des fonctions thêta, d'après des mémoires de Poincaré et Frobenius (theta functions)

1949/50 series

For later years see:

Séminaire Nicolas Bourbaki (1950–1959)
Séminaire Nicolas Bourbaki (1960–1969)
Séminaire Nicolas Bourbaki (1970–1979)
Séminaire Nicolas Bourbaki (1980–1989)
Séminaire Nicolas Bourbaki (1990–1999)

Publishers 
The proceedings of the Séminaire have been published by four different publishers over the years. 1948/49 through 1964/65 were published as Textes des conférences / Séminaire Bourbaki  by the Secrétariat Mathématique, Université Paris. In 1966, W. A. Benjamin, Inc. issued a special twelve-volume facsimile reproduction of the Séminaire Bourbaki, 1948-1965. W. A. Benjamin, Inc. continued to publish the proceedings for three more years, 1965/66 through 1967/68. Springer-Verlag published 1968/69 through 1980/81 as part of its Lecture Notes in Mathematics series. 1981/82 to date are published by the Société Mathématique de France as part of Astérisque.

References

External links
Copies of the Séminaire papers
Source list
"L'Association des Collaborateurs de Nicolas Bourbaki" The pdf file  of seminar number (say) 984 is available at https://web.archive.org/web/20110609193039/http://www.bourbaki.ens.fr/TEXTES/984.pdf.

French mathematical seminars